Urgleptes foveatocollis is a species of beetle in the family Cerambycidae. It was described by Hamilton in 1896.

References

Urgleptes
Beetles described in 1896